John Marshall High School is a public high school located in the Los Feliz district of the city of Los Angeles at 3939 Tracy Street in Los Angeles, California.

Marshall, which serves grades 9 through 12, is a part of the Los Angeles Unified School District. Marshall is named after jurist John Marshall, who served as the fourth Chief Justice of the United States for three decades.

Students at Marshall primarily come from Los Feliz, Atwater Village, East Hollywood, northeastern Koreatown, Elysian Valley, and Silver Lake.

Within the school, there are many Small Learning Communities, including the School for Environmental Studies, the school's only California Partnership Academy, the Performing Arts Academy, the Artistic Vision Academy, the STARS Academy, the Renaissance Academy, and the Social Justice Academy. The School also houses a School for Advanced Studies and a Gifted/High Ability Magnet.

History 
Designed by architect George M. Lindsey in the Collegiate Gothic style, and constructed in 1930, John Marshall High School first opened its doors on January 26, 1931, with approximately 1,200 students and 48 teachers. Joseph Sniffen, for whom the auditorium was named, served as the Principal, while Hugh Boyd and Geraldine Keith acted as Marshall's first Vice-Principals. The football field was named in Boyd's honor, while the library was named for Keith.

During the first semester of the school's existence, the faculty and students cooperatively selected the school motto, seal, and colors. The school motto, Veritas Vincit (Truth Conquers...), was an easy choice since this was a favorite sentiment of John Marshall. The school seal shows an open Book of Learning, behind which is projected the scales of justice with Veritas Vincit emblazoned on the bar. Two shades of blue became the official colors of the high school; the moonlight blue of midnight and the sunlight blue of dawn. Since the color blue is symbolic of truth, the choice of colors harmonized with the school's motto. John Montapert and Henry Suykida, two Marshall students who graduated in the Winter Class of 1939, composed "Alma Mater", the official school song.

The school's mascot is the "Barrister." The school's service organization is the Continentals. A bust of John Marshall stands in the center of the Senior Court.

It was in the Los Angeles City High School District until 1961, when it merged into LAUSD.

Following the Sylmar earthquake of 1971, some of Marshall's buildings were condemned. The cafeteria was torn down, but the Los Feliz community, led by "Citizens to Save Marshall" activists Joanne Gabrielson, Alberta Burke, Sherril Boller, and Nina Mohi tirelessly campaigned to save the unique Collegiate Gothic Main Building. In 1975, this building was closed for structural strengthening and all classes moved to temporary bungalows. In September 1980 the refurbished Main Building was opened. A new building now houses the library, cafeteria, and science classrooms. Mike Haynes Stadium, the school's football and track stadium, also dates to 1981.

In one basketball game in 1986 Jerry Simon, who that season was the Section 3-A Los Angeles City Player of the Year, scored 69 points for Marshall, establishing a new single-game scoring record for a high school player in Los Angeles, as the team won by a score of 98-61.

Today, Marshall has an enrollment of approximately 2,400 students and a teaching staff of 106.

Notable alumni 

 Bob Arbogast, Los Angeles talk show host and Chicago disc jockey
 Pete Arbogast, Hall of Fame sportscaster, longtime Voice of the USC Trojans
 Michael D. Antonovich, member of Los Angeles County Board of Supervisors 
 apl.de.ap, vocalist, songwriter, producer and rapper for The Black Eyed Peas
 Barry C. Barish, 2017 Nobel Prize winner in Physics
 Karin Booth, film and television actress of the 1940s through 1960s
 John Browning, two time Grammy-winning virtuoso pianist
 Gabriel Chavarria, actor
 Robert "Tree" Cody, Native American flutist
 Lyor Cohen, former CEO of Warner Music Group (WMG)
 Caryl Chessman, known as the "Red Light Bandit", was a cause celebre for the movement to ban capital punishment.
 John Paul DeJoria, co-founder and CEO of John Paul Mitchell Systems and Patrón
 Leonardo DiCaprio, actor, environmentalist
 Heidi Fleiss, Hollywood madam
 Ed Fredkin, computer scientist, physicist
 Courtney Gains, actor
 Lola Glaudini, actress
 Robin Graham, missing person
 Mike Haynes, NFL Hall of Famer
 Eddie Hodges, actor
 David Ho, physician and 1996 Time Person of the Year
 Will Hutchins, actor known as Tom "Sugarfoot" Brewster in 1950s Warner Bros. television series Sugarfoot
 Lance Ito, Los Angeles Superior Court judge famous for the O.J. Simpson trial in 1995
 Anne-Marie Johnson, television actress and first National Vice President of the Screen Actors Guild
 Alex Kozinski, Chief Judge of the United States Court of Appeals for the 9th Circuit
 Dan Kwong, performance artist and playwright (Be Like Water)
 Tom LaBonge, member of the Los Angeles City Council (2001–15)
 Rosemary LaPlanche, Miss America 1941
 Carol Lin, CNN broadcaster
 Warren Miller (director), made over 750 films on skiing and other outdoor sports
 Ronn Moss, songwriter and member of Player and actor (The Bold and the Beautiful, assorted films)
 Julie Newmar, actress, known for her role as Catwoman in the television series Batman
 Michelle Phillips, singer and member of the 1960s singing group The Mamas and the Papas
 Andy Reid, two-time Super Bowl-Winning NFL head football coach, Kansas City Chiefs
Yesika Salgado, poet and co-founder of the poetry collective Chingona Fire.
 Joel Seligman, President of the University of Rochester
 Jerry Simon (born 1968), American-Israeli basketball player; set LA single-game scoring record 
 Chris Tashima, actor and Academy Award-winning filmmaker (Visas and Virtue)
 Bill Toomey, 1968 Olympic decathlon champion; taught at Marshall
 Hal Uplinger, NBA player Baltimore Bullets 1947-53, CBS sports and entertainment producer, first to use the instant replay technique still used in TV sportscasting
 Bob Vickman,  American pilot and also served as one of the first pilots in the Israeli Air Force. He died in defense of the newly reborn Jewish State. 
 will.i.am, vocalist, producer and songwriter for The Black Eyed Peas
 La Monte Young, composer
 Sick Jacken, rapper, writer, and producer for Psycho Realm
 Alexa Demie, singer, actor in Euphoria

In popular culture

Shots of Marshall have been used for a variety of movies and television series, most notably Grease, La Bamba, Buffy the Vampire Slayer (film), Mr. Novak, Bachelor Party, Boy Meets World, The Wonder Years, Smart Guy, Kenan & Kel, Sister, Sister, Grosse Pointe Blank, A Nightmare on Elm Street, Can't Hardly Wait, Supernatural, Boston Public, The Suite Life of Zack & Cody, Cory in the House, Hannah Montana, Pretty in Pink, Good Burger, Zapped!, Like Father Like Son, Girls Just Want to Have Fun, Lucas Tanner, Amityville 4, Charlie Bartlett, Slaughterhouse Rock, Cirque du Freak, School of Rock, Home Room, iCarly, Hang Time, Who's the Boss?, True Crime, Amateur, Sierra Burgess Is a Loser, Space Jam, and Highway to Heaven.
An exterior of the school is shown during Miley Cyrus's Best of Both Worlds Tour during the song "Nobody's Perfect".
German automaker Audi used the school to film a new commercial, featuring its Audi Q5 crossover SUV.
The Pharcyde shot their video "Runnin'" both inside and outside the Collegiate Gothic Main Building.
American rock band Van Halen used the school to shoot the music video for "Hot for Teacher".
Logic (rapper) shot his video 1-800-273-8255 (song) around the high school campus, namely inside of the main building and on the football field.
Bebe Rexha "I'm Gonna Show Your Crazy" music video incorporates the entrance of the high school and hallway.
Juice WRLD and Benny Blanco filmed "Graduation" around the campus, which featured stars such as Ross Butler, Madison Beer, and Dove Cameron.
Season 15 Episode 5 of Grey's Anatomy Betty's high school.

See also

References

External links 
 

Marshall
Marshall
Public high schools in California
Los Feliz, Los Angeles
Atwater Village, Los Angeles
East Hollywood, Los Angeles
Educational institutions established in 1931
1931 establishments in California